This is a list of Canadian television related events from 2003.

Events

Debuts

Ending this year

Television shows

1950s
Country Canada (1954–2007)
Hockey Night in Canada (1952–present, sports telecast)
The National (1954–present, news program)

1960s
CTV National News (1961–present)
Land and Sea (1964–present)
The Nature of Things (1960–present)
Question Period (1967–present, news program)
W-FIVE (1966–present, newsmagazine program)

1970s
Canada AM (1972–present, news program)
the fifth estate (1975–present)
Marketplace (1972–present, newsmagazine program)
100 Huntley Street (1977–present, religious program)

1980s
CityLine (1987–present, news program)
Fashion File (1989–2009)
Just For Laughs (1988–present)
On the Road Again (1987–2007)
Venture (1985–2007)

1990s
CBC News Morning (1999–present)
Cold Squad (1998–2005)
Da Vinci's Inquest (1998–2005)
Daily Planet (1995–present)
eTalk (1995–present, entertainment newsmagazine program)
The Passionate Eye (1993–present)
Life and Times (1996–2007)
The Red Green Show (1991–2006)
Royal Canadian Air Farce (1993–2008, comedy sketch series)
This Hour Has 22 Minutes (1992–present)
Yvon of the Yukon (1999–2005, children's animated series)
Witness (1992–2004)

2000s
Andromeda (2000–2005, Canadian/American co-production)
Blue Murder (2001–2004)
Degrassi: The Next Generation (2001–present)
Edgemont (2001–2005)
JR Digs (2001–present, comedy prank series)
Kenny vs. Spenny (2002–2010, comedy reality series)
Mutant X (2001–2004, Canadian-American co-production)
Paradise Falls (2001–present)
Puppets Who Kill (2002–2004)
Sue Thomas: F.B.Eye (2002–2003, Canadian/American co-production)
Trailer Park Boys (2001–2008)
What's with Andy (2001–2007, children's animated series)

TV movies and specials
 The Joe Blow Show
 Noël Noël
 Shattered City: The Halifax Explosion

Television stations

Debuts

References

See also
 2003 in Canada
 List of Canadian films of 2003